Baldivis Secondary College (BSC) is a high school located in Stillwater Drive, Baldivis, Western Australia. It is situated 46 kilometres south of Perth and is the first public high-school in the Baldivis area of Rockingham. Baldivis Secondary was first constructed in late 2012 and opened in 2013 (opened to accommodate early year/grade 8's) and was completed 68 weeks later, in early 2015 and has been growing since then. The school currently holds approximately 1,600 students and 200 staff as of 2021, with the capacity to hold and educate approximately 2,000 students in total, although the school is constantly growing to accommodate rapidly increasing number of students every year.

Baldivis Secondary College and its distinct structural facilities, when compared to other public schools in the Rockingham/Baldivis area, offers a broad curriculum. The school uses the AVID educational system, like the majority of WA schools.

Establishment 
Baldivis Secondary College is a $27.5 million (AUD) construction Development, although it was originally allocated to be $40.6 million. The establishment, as well as the construction of the school, was completed by the JCY architects.

Construction 
The construction of Baldivis Secondary College began in late 2012. The school's area is approximately 42,000m2. The construction of the school was originally forecast to cost between $1 million and $70 million (AUD), according to JCY. Baldivis Secondary college was forecasted to be built in the newly developed area of the Rivergums estate, with residential development on two sides, and public space on the other. As predicted,  the new Senior Highschool would eventually collocate with the newly built primary school next to it (Rivergums Primary school). The school was originally designed by architects Eddy Kyrgiel and James Vandezande, with collaboration from JCY to help construct the school.

The school contains 7 blocks, or buildings, including the administration, the library, food, science, cafeteria (canteen), sports hall, performing arts centre, arts block and materials technology blocks. The landscaping is intended to be reminiscent to the original bushland of the area.

Education 
The school has over 1,800 students, comprising all year groups.

The school teaches the compulsory subjects: Mathematics, English, Humanities and Social Sciences, Health, Physical Education (Sports), and Science. The school also teaches non-compulsory subjects which include Music, Metalwork/Woodwork/Material Technology, Jewellery, Food Science/Cooking, Film, Photography, Arts, Dance/Drama, and IT classes.

References

External links 
 

Public high schools in Western Australia
2012 establishments in Australia
Educational institutions established in 2012
Baldivis, Western Australia